Tyazhinsky (masculine), Tyazhinskaya (feminine), or Tyazhinskoye (neuter) may refer to:
Tyazhinsky District, a district of Kemerovo Oblast, Russia
Tyazhinsky (urban-type settlement), an urban-type settlement in Tyazhinsky District of Kemerovo Oblast, Russia